Giriraj Kishore (8 July 1937 – 9 February 2020) was an Indian writer, who was awarded the Padma Shri by the president of India in 2007. He lived in Kanpur and was a retired government servant. He was given the Sahitya Akademi Award in 1992, the Vyas Samman in 2000, and an honorary Ph.D. by Chhatrapati Shahu Ji Maharaj University in 2002.

Biography 

Giriraj Kishore was born in Muzzafarnagar in 1937. His father was a zamindar, but because of his socialist principles and lack of interest in zamindari system Giriraj left home at a young age and became a Gandhian. He completed his master's degree in social work from The Institute of Social Sciences, Agra. He completed an emeritus fellowship by the University Grants Commission, Government of India in 1998–1999. He also did a fellowship at Indian Institute of Advanced Study, Simla from 1999 to 2001.

He had worked at different posts as an officer in the government, including as registrar of Kanpur University (Chhatrapati Shahu Ji Maharaj University) and the Indian Institute of Technology Kanpur in a career spanning more than 30 years. He was formerly a member of the Sahitya Akademi working committee, and the Railway Board of GOI.

He was married to Mrs. Meera Kishore and has 2 daughters and a son. Both his daughters are married. After his retirement from IIT KANPUR he resided in Kanpur . He also wrote articles regularly in newspapers and was the editor of a Hindi magazine Aakar.

Awards 
 Sahitya Akademi – 1992
 Vyas samman     – 2000
 Padma Shri. – 2007

Selected works 

 Pahla Girmitiya (The Girmitiya Saga), for which he received the Padma Shri in 2007.
Baa (Kasturba Gandhi- a bio fiction)
Dhai Ghar
Parishishta
Aanjaney jayate etc.

References 

1937 births
2020 deaths
Writers from Uttar Pradesh
People from Muzaffarnagar
Recipients of the Padma Shri in literature & education
Recipients of the Sahitya Akademi Award in Hindi